Cobar Airport  is an airport located  southwest of Cobar, a town in the Australian state of New South Wales.

Facilities

Airlines and destinations

See also
List of airports in New South Wales

Gallery

References

External links
 

Airports in New South Wales
Cobar